Edwardstown was an electoral district of the House of Assembly in the Australian state of South Australia from 1956 to 1970.

Edwardstown replaced the Electoral district of Goodwood, Frank Walsh being the last member for Goodwood. Edwardstown was replaced by the Electoral district of Ascot Park.

At the 2018 state election, the suburb of Edwardstown was in Labor seats of Badcoe.

Members

Election results

References 

Former electoral districts of South Australia
1956 establishments in Australia
1970 disestablishments in Australia